James Gerard Spanarkel (born June 28, 1957) is an American television analyst for College Basketball on CBS and a former professional basketball player for the Philadelphia 76ers and the Dallas Mavericks. He played college basketball for Duke University, where he was an All-American.

Career

High school
Born and raised in Jersey City, New Jersey, Spanarkel played at Hudson Catholic Regional High School, where he was a teammate of future NBA player Mike O'Koren.

College and professional basketball

Spanarkel was a First Team Acclaim All American, in addition the First Team All-ACC and the first 2000-point scorer in Duke Blue Devils history. He was named Duke's team MVP for his final three seasons, 1977, 1978, and 1979. Spanarkel was also team captain in his junior and senior years, and was announced NCAA's East Regional Most Outstanding Player in 1978. Duke finished as the national runner-up that year to Kentucky. At Duke, Spanarkel was also a pitcher on the baseball team for two years. He graduated from university in 1979, and during the summer of 1980, he studied for and obtained a real estate broker's license.

The Philadelphia 76ers drafted Spanarkel with the 16th overall pick in the 1979 NBA Draft on October 17, and he spent his first season as a rookie, the 1979–80 campaign, with the Sixers. He was then drafted by the Dallas Mavericks and played the following four seasons with them, leading the club in scoring for the 1980–81 season with a 14.4 ppg average. His NBA career ended in 1984, after a season during which a broken right wrist cost him three months on the bench.

American broadcaster
Spanarkel worked 30 years as Nets television analyst (currently on the YES Network), both with Ian Eagle courtside as a color commentator and more recently as a studio host during pre and post-game.  Spanarkel was terminated by YES prior to the 2020-21 season. Currently, he works CBS Sports' regular season and postseason coverage with Eagle. He previously was as a studio analyst for NBA TV. During his entire broadcasting career, he has provided basketball coverage on CBS Sports, ESPN, Fox Sports, and YES. In 2013, Spanarkel called the international telecasts of the 2013 NBA Finals alongside Eagle. He has also been chief commentator for the Travers Cups and various member guest tournaments at Upper Montclair.

Personal life
Spanarkel is married to Janet, and the couple has four children, James, Bridget, Stephanie, and Andrew. He is currently a First Vice President and a certified financial planner at Merrill Lynch in New Jersey.

Spanarkel has been a resident of Rutherford, New Jersey.

Statistics

Duke record book

Honors

 In 1990, Jim Spanarkel was inducted into the Duke Sports Hall of Fame.
 In 2001, Spanarkel was inducted into the Duke Circle of Honor.
 Jim Spanarkel was inducted into the UPI First Team All-America: 1979.
 He was inducted second into the All-ACC Team.
 MVP of All-ACC Tournament teams in 1978; 1979.
 He was the ACC Freshman of the year in 1976 for Duke.
 He has the NCAA East Regional MOP: 1978.
 He was the All-NCAA Tournament's Most Outstanding Player.
 Sparnakel was GTE Academic All-Americans consecutively in 1978 and 1979.
 James was Team Captain in 1978–1979.
 Won the Swett Memorial Trophy (Duke MVP) three years in a row: 1977, 1978, and 1979.
 In 2014, won the New York Emmy Award for Best Sports Analyst for the YES Network broadcasts of Brooklyn Nets games.

References

External links
 Jim Spanarkel NBA statistics

1957 births
Living people
All-American college men's basketball players
American men's basketball players
Basketball players from Jersey City, New Jersey
Brooklyn Nets announcers
College basketball announcers in the United States
Dallas Mavericks expansion draft picks
Dallas Mavericks players
Duke Blue Devils men's basketball players
Merrill (company) people
New Jersey Nets announcers
People from Rutherford, New Jersey
Philadelphia 76ers draft picks
Philadelphia 76ers players
Shooting guards
Small forwards